Cosentino is an Italian surname. Notable people with the surname include:

Antonio Cosentino (artist), Turkish artist
Antonio Cosentino, Italian sailor
Barbara Cosentino, second wife of Gary Crosby
Barbara Ann Cosentino, wife of Robert J. Cenker
Bethany Cosentino, American musician, member of Best Coast and Pocahaunted
Chris Cosentino, American chef
Chris Cosentino, American musician, former member of The A-Sides
Curt Cosentino, American musician, member of Polyrock
 Cosentino, Australian magician and illusionist
Frank Cosentino, Canadian football player
Frank J. Cosentino, American business executive/author, president of Edward Marshall Boehm, Inc.
Ivan Cosentino, Argentine record producer/publisher, co-founder of Discos Qualiton
Jerome Cosentino, American politician
John Cosentino, American movie special effects artist, special effects artist on The Alien Factor
Nicola Cosentino, Italian politician
Ron Cosentino, American screenwriter/director/producer, screenwriter/director/producer of Fallen Arches
Rosario "Saro" Cosentino, Italian songwriter, co-writer of various songs recorded by Franco Battiato.
Sam Cosentino, Canadian sportscaster.
Seth Gabel (born Seth Cosentino), American actor.
Vicente Cosentino, Argentine cinematographer.
Vincenzo Cosentino, Italian filmmaker.

See also 
Castiglione Cosentino, a town in Calabria, Italy

Italian-language surnames
Lists of people by surname